Park Jong-geun (born 5 February 1937) is a South Korean politician. A member of the United Liberal Democrats, the Saenuri Party, and later the Future Hope Alliance, he served in the National Assembly from 1996 to 2012.

References

1937 births
Living people
20th-century South Korean politicians
21st-century South Korean politicians
United Liberal Democrats politicians
Liberty Korea Party politicians
Members of the National Assembly (South Korea)
Kyeongbuk High School alumni
Seoul National University alumni
Washington State University alumni
People from Sangju